KDVC may refer to:

 KDVC (FM), a radio station (98.3 FM) licensed to serve Columbia, Missouri, United States
 KCDC (FM), a radio station (102.5 FM) licensed to serve Loma, Colorado, United States, which held the call sign KDVC from 2007 to 2015